The 2022 season is Young Lion's 19th consecutive season in the top flight of Singapore football and in the S.League.

Key Events 
 Danish Irfan and Jordan Emaviwe were injured during the AFF u23 tournament and will miss significant time out. Danish partially torn his ACL and meniscus while Jordan had a broken jaw.

Squad

Singapore Premier League

U19 Squad
(Singapore Sport School)

Coaching staff

Transfer

In 
Pre-Season

Out

Pre-Season

Note 1: Daniel Goh will join Balestier Khalsa after completing his NS stint in April 2022.

Note 2: Ilhan Fandi will join Albirex Niigata after completing his NS stint in April 2022.

Mid-Season

Loan In 
Pre-Season

Note 1: Harhys Stewart returns on loan for another season.

Mid-Season

Loan Out

Pre-Season

Loan Return
Pre-Season

Note 1: Danish Irfan will subsequently moved to Tampines Rovers after his contract with Geylang International ended at his end of NS stint. He will stay with the club till he completes his NS in April/May 2022.'Note 2: Hami Syahin returned to Lion City Sailors after completing his NS.

Note 3: Zulqarnaen Suzliman will continue with GYL and return to Lion City Sailors after completing his NS.

Note 4: Syahrul Sazali, Joel Chew, Shah Shahiran will continue with GYL and return to Tampines Rovers after completing their NS.

Note 5: Zamani Zamri will continue with GYL until and return to Albirex Niigata (S) after completing his NS in April 2022.

Note 6: Dylan Pereira and Hakim Redzuan loan to the GYL were extended for another season.Mid-Season Retained 

 Friendly 
 Pre-Season Friendly 

 In-Season Friendly 

 Team statistics 

 Appearances and goals 

Numbers in parentheses denote appearances as substitute.

 Competitions 
 Overview 
 Singapore Premier League 

Singapore Cup

Group

Competition (U21) 

Stage 1  League table Stage 2 League table '

See also 
 2017 Garena Young Lions FC season
 2018 Young Lions FC season
 2019 Young Lions FC season
 2020 Young Lions FC season
 2021 Young Lions FC season

Notes

References 

Young Lions FC
2022
1
Young Lions FC seasons